KNLV may refer to:

 KNLV (AM), a radio station (1060 AM) licensed to Ord, Nebraska, United States
 KNLV-FM, a radio station (103.9 FM) licensed to Ord, Nebraska, United States